The Group A of the 1999 Copa América was one of the three groups of competing nations in the 1999 Copa América. It comprised Paraguay, Bolivia, Peru, and Japan. Group play began on June 29 and ended on July 5.

Paraguay won the group and faced Uruguay, the second-best third-placed finisher, in the quarterfinals. Peru finished second and faced Mexico—the runner-up of Group B—in the quarterfinals. Bolivia and Japan finished third and fourth in the group, respectively, and were eliminated from the tournament.

Standings

Teams that advanced to the quarterfinals
Group winners
Group runners-up
Best two third-placed teams among all groups
All times are in local, Paraguay Time (UTC−03:00).

Matches

Peru v Japan

Paraguay v Bolivia

Peru v Bolivia

Paraguay v Japan

Japan v Bolivia

Paraguay v Peru

External links
Copa América 1999 Official Site

Group A
1999 in Paraguayan football
1999 in Japanese football
1999 in Bolivian football
1999 in Peruvian football